Walter Ross Borthwick (4 April 1948 – 24 April 2021) was a Scottish football player and coach. He played for Greenock Morton, Brighton & Hove Albion, East Fife, St Mirren, St Johnstone, and Dunfermline Athletic. He later managed Arbroath and was the first team coach at Hearts during most of the 1980s. Borthwick subsequently worked for the Scottish Football Association in East Lothian, before retiring in March 2013.

References

External links

1948 births
2021 deaths
Footballers from Edinburgh
Association football midfielders
Scottish footballers
Greenock Morton F.C. players
Brighton & Hove Albion F.C. players
East Fife F.C. players
St Mirren F.C. players
St Johnstone F.C. players
Dunfermline Athletic F.C. players
Scottish Football League players
English Football League players
Scottish football managers
Arbroath F.C. managers
Scottish Football League managers
Heart of Midlothian F.C. non-playing staff
Association football coaches